"Cold" is a single by Dutch three-piece girl group O'G3NE. The song was released in the Netherlands as a digital download on 13 March 2015 by 8ball TV. The song peaked at number 70 on the Dutch Singles Chart.

Track listing

Chart performance

Weekly charts

Release history

References

2015 songs
2015 singles
O'G3NE songs